The canton of Livarot-Pays-d'Auge (before 2021: Livarot) is an administrative division of the Calvados department, northwestern France. Its borders were modified at the French canton reorganisation which came into effect in March 2015. Its seat is in Livarot-Pays-d'Auge.

Composition

It consists of the following communes:

Cernay
La Folletière-Abenon
Lisores
Livarot-Pays-d'Auge
Orbec
Saint-Denis-de-Mailloc
Saint-Martin-de-Bienfaite-la-Cressonnière
Saint-Pierre-en-Auge
Val-de-Vie
Valorbiquet
Vendeuvre
La Vespière-Friardel

Councillors

Pictures of the canton

References

Cantons of Calvados (department)